Namtok Kaeng Sopha is a waterfall in Wang Thong District, Phitsanulok Province, Thailand.  It is in Thung Salaeng Luang National Park on the Wang Thong River off of Lomsak Road (Highway 12). It is the largest waterfall in Phitsanulok. Kaeng Sopha is a tiered waterfall shaped like a stairway. Kaeng Sopha is the subject of a June 2007 postage stamp in Thailand in the Thailand Waterfall series.

References

Geography of Phitsanulok province
Kaeng Sopha
Tourist attractions in Phitsanulok province